The Winnipeg Jets are a Canadian professional ice hockey team based in Winnipeg, Manitoba. They play in the Central Division of the Western Conference in the National Hockey League (NHL). The team joined the NHL in 1999 as an expansion team as the Atlanta Thrashers, but moved to Winnipeg, Manitoba in 2011, being renamed after the previous Winnipeg Jets team (now playing as the Arizona Coyotes). The Jets play their home games at the MTS Centre. There have been three general managers since the franchise's inception.

Key

General managers

See also
List of NHL general managers

Notes
 A running total of the number of general managers of the franchise. Thus any general manager who has two or more separate terms as general manager is only counted once.

References

General managers
Winnipeg Jets
General managers
 
Winnipeg Jets general managers